Engelmann Peak is a high mountain summit in the Front Range of the Rocky Mountains of North America. The mountain was named in honor of the botanist George Engelmann.

The mountain is named for George Engelmann (1809-1884) a famous botanist responsible for
describing and naming flora in the Rocky Mountains. He was born and educated in Germany
and received his medical degree there. In 1832, he sailed to America. His financial backing had
come from relatives in Germany who wanted him to invest in the lands of the new country so he
explored areas in Illinois, Missouri and Arkansas.

Historical names
Cowles Mountain
Engelmann Peak – 1912 
Englemann Peak

See also

List of Colorado mountain ranges
List of Colorado mountain summits
List of Colorado fourteeners
List of Colorado 4000 meter prominent summits
List of the most prominent summits of Colorado
List of Colorado county high points

References

External links

Mountains of Colorado
Mountains of Clear Creek County, Colorado
Arapaho National Forest
North American 4000 m summits